Fenyane is a community council located in the Leribe District of Lesotho. Its population in 2006 was 10,271.

Villages
The community of Fenyane includes the villages of

Ha 'MamaloHa 'NenaHa 'NyaneHa ChaleHa Fako (Lipetu)Ha LefoleriHa LetsekaHa MahooanaHa MakhobaloHa MalekutuHa Malotha

Ha MamotjapelaHa MapotoHa MaroalaHa MathaiHa MatoliHa MatonaHa MohlobolotsoHa MokhachaneHa MosuoaneHa NtasiHa Nthathakane

Ha PhakisoHa PhelaneHa RalieeHa RamapepeHa RanthaeleHa SekoalaHa TeisiHa TsaeHa TšepeLibopingLikhahleng (Lipetu)

LikhopengLikilengLipetuMafoling (Ha Tšepe)MahlabathengMaphotongThaba-LesobaThella BoyThota-Khubelu (Lipetu)Thoteng (Ha Tšepe)

References

External links
 Google map of community villages

Populated places in Leribe District